Twelve is the tenth studio album by Patti Smith, released April 17, 2007 on Columbia Records. The album contains twelve tracks, all of which are covers. It debuted on the Billboard 200 at number 60, with 11,000 copies sold in its first week. A promotional EP entitled Two More was also released, featuring two covers that are not on the album: "Perfect Day" by Lou Reed and "Here I Dreamt I Was an Architect" by the Decemberists.

Track listing

Personnel 
Band
 Patti Smith – vocals, clarinet
 Lenny Kaye – acoustic and electric guitar
 Jay Dee Daugherty – drums, percussion; accordion on "Helpless"
 Tony Shanahan – bass, keyboards, vocals

Additional personnel
 Andi Ostrowe – live sound mixing
 Barre Duryea – bass on "Helpless"
 David Bett – art direction
 Duncan Webster – acoustic guitar on "Smells Like Teen Spirit"
 Emery Dobyns – engineering, mixing
 Flea – bass on "Gimme Shelter" and "White Rabbit"
 Giovanni Sollima – cello on "Are You Experienced?"
 Greg Calbi – mastering
 Jack Petruzelli – acoustic guitar on "Within You Without You"
 Jackson Smith – guitar solo on "Everybody Wants to Rule the World"
 Jesse Smith – backing vocals on "Changing of the Guards"
 John Cohen – banjo on "Smells Like Teen Spirit"
 Luis Resto – piano on "Pastime Paradise"
 Mario Resto – drums on "Pastime Paradise"
 Paul Nowinski – double bass on "Pastime Paradise"
 Peter Stampfel – fiddle on "Smells Like Teen Spirit"
 Rich Robinson – dulcimer on "The Boy in the Bubble"; guitar on "Midnight Rider"
 Sam Shepard – banjo on "Smells Like Teen Spirit"
 Steven Sebring – photography
 Tom Verlaine – slide guitar on "Gimme Shelter"
 Walker Shepard – banjo on "Smells Like Teen Spirit"

Charts

Sales

Release history

References

External links 
 
 Twelve at Sony BMG

Patti Smith albums
2007 albums
Albums produced by Lenny Kaye
Columbia Records albums
Covers albums